The March 1995 Ulster Unionist Party leadership election occurred at the Annual General Meeting of the Ulster Unionist Council on 18 March 1995.  The UUP has had a leadership election every March since at least 1973, and this is one of the few occasions when it has been contested. James Molyneaux was re-elected as Leader with 86% of the votes.

Candidates

James H. Molyneaux MP, incumbent leader since 1979
Lee Reynolds, a 21-year-old student from Coleraine, member of the Young Unionists.

It was widely speculated that Ulster Unionist MP David Trimble was one of those behind Reynolds's candidature, although Trimble, his aides and Reynolds' supporters all denied this at the time and subsequently.

Results

Whilst Molyneaux won by a massive margin, the number of delegates who did not vote for him was seen as a substantial number. Two days later independent North Down MP, Sir James Kilfedder died in London and that the subsequent by-election was not won by the UUP was seen as further evidence of Molyneaux's failings as leader after 15 years. Molyneaux resigned on 28 August and was replaced in September. Reynolds was later elected to Belfast City Council as a member of the DUP.

References
Goodson, Dean Himself Alone: David Trimble and the ordeal of Unionism (London, Harper Perennial, 2004), p. 127.

Notes

1995-03
1995 elections in the United Kingdom
1995 elections in Northern Ireland
Ulster Unionist Party leadership election